The men's marathon at the 1991 World Championships in Athletics in Tokyo, Japan was held on September 1, 1991. The race started at 18:00 local time.

Medalists

Records

Intermediates

Results

See also
 1990 European Athletics Championships – Men's marathon
 Athletics at the 1992 Summer Olympics – Men's marathon

References
 Results
 IAAF Results

Marathon
Marathons at the World Athletics Championships
World Championships
Men's marathons
Marathons in Japan